National Forward Bloc was a political party in Tamil Nadu, India. The party was founded in 1977 by K. Kandasamy and T.P.M. Periyasami, following a split from the All India Forward Bloc.

In 1980 NFB suffered a split, as a group led by Ayyanan Ambalam left to found the Pasumpon Forward Bloc.

In 1981, NFB and PFB merged and formed the Tamil Nadu Forward Bloc.

Sources
Bose, K., Forward Bloc, Madras: Tamil Nadu Academy of Political Science, 1988.

Defunct political parties in Tamil Nadu
1977 establishments in Tamil Nadu
Political parties established in 1977
All India Forward Bloc